"Time Enough at Last" is the eighth episode of the American television anthology series The Twilight Zone. The episode was adapted from a short story written by Lynn Venable. The short story appeared in the January 1953 edition of the science fiction magazine If: Worlds of Science Fiction  about seven years before the television episode first aired.

"Time Enough at Last" became one of the most famous episodes of the original Twilight Zone. It is "the story of a man who seeks salvation in the rubble of a ruined world" and tells of Henry Bemis, played by Burgess Meredith, who loves books yet is surrounded by those who would prevent him from reading them. The episode follows Bemis through the post-apocalyptic world, touching on such social issues as anti-intellectualism, the dangers of reliance upon technology, and the difference between solitude and loneliness.

Opening narration

Plot
Bank teller and avid bookworm Henry Bemis reads David Copperfield while serving a customer from his window in a bank. He is so engrossed in the novel he attempts to regale the increasingly annoyed woman with information about the characters, and shortchanges her. Bemis' angry boss, and later his nagging wife, both complain to him that he wastes far too much time reading "doggerel". As a cruel joke, his wife asks him to read poetry to her from one of his books; he eagerly obliges, only to find that she has crossed out the text on every page, obscuring the words. Seconds later, she destroys the book by ripping the pages from it, much to Henry's dismay.

The next day, as usual, Henry takes his lunch break in the bank's vault, where his reading cannot be disturbed. Moments after he sees a newspaper headline, which reads "H-Bomb Capable of Total Destruction", an enormous explosion outside shakes the vault, knocking Bemis unconscious. After regaining consciousness and recovering the thick glasses required for him to see, Bemis emerges from the vault to find the bank demolished and everyone in it dead. Leaving the bank, he sees that the entire city has been destroyed, and realizes that, while a nuclear war has devastated Earth, him being in the vault has saved him.

Finding himself alone in a shattered world with canned food to last him a lifetime and no means of leaving to look for other survivors, Bemis succumbs to despair. As he prepares to kill himself using a revolver he has found, Bemis sees the ruins of the public library in the distance. Investigating, he finds that the books are still intact; all the books he could ever hope for are his for the reading, and time to read them without interruption.

His despair gone, Bemis contentedly sorts the books he looks forward to reading for years to come, with no obligations to get in the way. Just as he bends down to pick up the first book, he stumbles, and his glasses fall off and shatter. In shock, he picks up the broken remains of the glasses without which he is virtually blind and breaks down in tears, surrounded by books he now can never read.

Closing narration

Production

"Time Enough at Last" was one of the first episodes written for The Twilight Zone. It introduced Burgess Meredith to the series; he went on to star in three more episodes, being introduced as "no stranger to The Twilight Zone" in promotional spots for season two's "The Obsolete Man". He also narrated the 1983 film Twilight Zone: The Movie, which made reference to "Time Enough at Last" during its opening sequence, with the characters discussing the episode in detail.

Footage of the exterior steps of the library was filmed several months after production had been completed. These steps can also be seen on the exterior of an Eloi public building in MGM's 1960 version of The Time Machine. John Brahm was nominated for a Directors Guild award for his work on the episode. The book that Bemis was reading in the vault and that flips open when the bomb explodes is A History of the Life and Voyages of Christopher Columbus by Washington Irving.

Themes
Although the overriding message may seem to "be careful what you wish for, you just might get it", there are other themes throughout the episode as well. Among these is the question of solitude versus loneliness, as embodied by Bemis' moment of near-suicide. Additionally, the portrayal of societal attitudes toward books speaks to the contemporary decline of traditional literature and how, given enough time, reading may become a relic of the past. At the same time, the ending "punishes Bemis for his antisocial behavior, and his greatest desire is thwarted".

Rod Serling's concluding statement in the episode alludes to Robert Burns' Scots language poem "To a Mouse". The poem concludes: "The best-laid schemes o' mice an men / Gang aft agley" (translation: "Often go awry").

Although "Time Enough at Last" implies that nuclear warfare has destroyed humanity, film critic Andrew Sarris notes that the episode's necessarily unrealistic format may have been what allowed its production to commence:

In the era of the Internet and eBooks, the irony depicted in "Time Enough at Last" has an information age counterpart, according to Weston Ochse of Storytellers Unplugged. As Ochse points out, when Bemis becomes the last person on Earth, he finally has time to read, with all his books at his fingertips and the only impediment is technology when his medium for accessing them—his glasses—breaks. In a hypothetical world where all books are published electronically, Ochse observes, readers would be "only a lightning strike, a faulty switch, a sleepy workman or a natural disaster away from becoming Henry Bemis at the end of the world"—that is, a power outage has the potential to give them time to read, yet like Bemis, they too would lose their medium for accessing their books—namely the computer.

Similar episodes
The Twilight Zone often explored similar themes throughout its run. "Time Enough at Last" has strong thematic ties to a number of other episodes in the series, starting with that of isolation, first explored in the series pilot, "Where Is Everybody?"  It is also a prominent theme in the previous episode "The Lonely". Additionally, in a plot very similar to that of "Time Enough at Last", "The Mind and the Matter" tells of a man who uses his mind to erase humanity, only to find that  existence without other people is unbearable. The notion of being an outsider, lost in a sea of conformity, was one of the most common themes of the series.

Other thematic elements in this episode can be found throughout the series, as well. "The Obsolete Man" takes the episode's literary subtext—the notion that reading may eventually be considered "obsolete"—to an extreme: The state has declared books obsolete and a librarian (also played by Meredith) finds himself on trial for his own obsolescence. This notion, akin to Ray Bradbury's short story "The Pedestrian" (1951), is also alluded to in the episode "Number 12 Looks Just Like You", in which a perfect and equal world contradictorily considers works like those of Shakespeare "smut".

Impact

Critical and fan favorite
"Time Enough at Last" was a ratings success in its initial airing and "became an instant classic". It "remains one of the best-remembered and best-loved episodes of The Twilight Zone" according to Marc Zicree, author of The Twilight Zone Companion, as well as one of the most frequently parodied. When a poll asked readers of Twilight Zone Magazine which episode of the series they remembered the most, "Time Enough at Last" was the most frequent response, with "To Serve Man" coming in a distant second. In TV Land's presentation of TV Guide'''s "100 Most Memorable Moments in Television", "Time Enough at Last" was ranked at No. 25. 
In an interview, Serling cited "Time Enough at Last" as one of his two favorites from the entire series. (The other episode was "The Invaders", with Agnes Moorehead.)

The episode has been referenced many times in popular culture. For example, The PC game Fallout Tactics (2001) includes a librarian in a desolate world who wants the player to find his missing glasses so he can read his books. The Twilight Zone Tower of Terror, a theme park ride at Disney's Hollywood Studios and formerly Disney California Adventure Park, displays a replica of Henry Bemis' broken glasses in the lobby. It is noted that, while they are indeed reading glasses, Burgess Meredith wears them the entire episode to make Bemis look more bookish.

References

Further reading
DeVoe, Bill. (2008). Trivia from The Twilight Zone. Albany, Georgia: Bear Manor Media. 
Grams, Martin. (2008). The Twilight Zone: Unlocking the Door to a Television Classic''. Churchville, Maryland: OTR Publishing.

External links
 

The Twilight Zone (1959 TV series season 1) episodes
World War III speculative fiction
1959 American television episodes
Reading (process)
Works about bibliophilia
Television episodes about nuclear war and weapons
Television shows based on short fiction